TSS Slieve Gallion was a twin screw steamer cargo vessel operated by the London and North Western Railway from 1908 to 1923, and the London, Midland and Scottish Railway from 1923 to 1937.

History

She was completed by Vickers, Sons & Maxim Ltd of Barrow-in-Furness for the London and North Western Railway in 1908.

She was named after the Slieve Gallion mountain in County Londonderry. She was very similar in specification to her sister ship, Slieve Bloom.

She was sold in May 1937 to Arnott Young and Company in Dalmuir for breaking, and replaced by the Slieve Bawn.

References

1907 ships
Passenger ships of the United Kingdom
Steamships
Ships built in Barrow-in-Furness
Ships of the London and North Western Railway